The Lancashire FA Women's County League is an amateur competitive women's association football competition based in Lancashire, England run by the Lancashire FA. Founded in 1996 as the Lancashire FA Girls League, the league consists of two division at levels 7 and 8 of the women's pyramid. It promotes to the North West Women's Regional Football League Division One, and does not relegate to any league.

Teams
The teams competing during the 2015–16 season are:

Division One
 Academy Juniors
 Barrowford Celtic
 Blackburn Community Sports Club Reserves
 Bolton Wanderers Ladies FC Development
 Burnley FC Girls & Ladies
 Morecambe FC Community Ladies
 Penwortham Ladies
 Southport Shoreline

Division Two
 Accrington Girls & Ladies Development
 Blackpool Wren Rovers Ladies FC Reserves
 Bury FC Girls & Ladies
 Cherry Tree Ladies FC
 Galgate Ladies
 Great Harwood Rovers Ladies
 Lancaster City
 Penwortham Town Ladies
 St. Josephs

References

External links
Official website

7
Football in Lancashire